This is a list of the governors and commandants of the Royal Military College, first at Great Marlow (1802–1812), then at Sandhurst (1813–1939), and of its successor on the same site, the Royal Military Academy Sandhurst (1947 to date).

The Commandant of the Academy, as of the former Royal Military College, is its commanding officer and is always a senior officer of field rank. Most Commandants serve for between two and three years and many go on to further significant promotions.

History of the role
The Royal Military College Sandhurst was originally led by a Governor (a figurehead), a Lieutenant Governor (in command of the college) and a Commandant (responsible for the cadets). In 1812 the posts of Lieutenant Governor and Commandant were merged into the role of Commandant. In 1888 the posts of Governor and Commandant were merged into the role of Governor and Commandant and in 1902 that single role was retitled Commandant.

With the creation of the merged Royal Military Academy in 1947, the commanding officer continued to be called the Commandant.

List of governors
1802–1811: General Sir William Harcourt (from 1809 the 3rd Earl Harcourt)
1811–1819: General Sir Alexander Hope
1819–1824: Major-General Sir George Murray
1824–1826: General Sir Alexander Hope
1826–1837: General Sir Edward Paget
1837–1856: General Sir George Scovell
1856–1866: General Sir Harry Jones
1866–1868: General Sir George Wetherall
1868–1875: Major-General Sir Duncan Cameron
1875–1882: Major-General William Napier
1883–1886: General Richard Chambré Hayes Taylor
1886–1888: General David Anderson

List of lieutenant-governors
1801–1811: Major-General John Gaspard Le Marchant
1811–1829: Colonel James Butler
1829–1837: Major-General Sir George Scovell
1837–1854: Major-General Thomas William Taylor
1854–1857: Colonel George Walter Prosser
1857–1864: Colonel Charles Rochfort Scott

List of commandants
The Commandants include:

Royal Military College, Sandhurst
1864–1869: Colonel Edmund Gilling Hallewell
1865–1874: Colonel Joseph Edward Addison (Superintendent of Studies)
1874–1879: Colonel Frederick Dobson Middleton (Assistant to the Governor)
1879–1884: Colonel Frederick Middleton (Commandant reporting to the Governor)
1884–1886: Colonel Frederick Solly-Flood (Commandant reporting to the Governor)
1886–1888: Colonel Aylmer Cameron (Commandant reporting to the Governor)
1888–1893: Lieutenant-General Edward Clive (Governor and Commandant)
1893–1898: Lieutenant-General Sir Cecil East (Governor and Commandant)
1898–1902: Lieutenant-General Sir Edwin Markham (Governor and Commandant)
1902–1907: Major-General Gerald Kitson
1907–1911: Colonel William Capper
1911–1914: Major-General Lionel Stopford
1914–1916: Brigadier-General Stuart Rolt
1916–1919: Major-General Lionel Stopford
1919–1923: Major-General Sir Reginald Stephens
1923–1923: Major-General Herbert Shoubridge
1923–1927: Major-General Charles Corkran
1927–1930: Major-General Eric Girdwood
1931–1934: Major-General Reginald May
1934–1937: Major-General Bertie Fisher
1938–1939: Major-General Ralph Eastwood

Royal Military Academy, Sandhurst, 1947 to present
1947–1948: Major-General Francis Matthews
1948–1950: Major-General Hugh Stockwell
1951–1954: Major-General David Dawnay
1954–1956: Major-General Reginald Hobbs
1956–1960: Major-General Ronald Urquhart
1960–1963: Major-General George Gordon-Lennox
1963–1966: Major-General John Mogg
1966–1968: Major-General Peter Hunt
1968–1972: Major-General Philip Tower
1972–1973: Major-General Jack Harman
1973–1976: Major-General Robert Ford
1976–1979: Major-General Philip Ward
1979–1982: Major-General Richard Vickers
1982–1983: Major-General Geoffrey Howlett
1983–1987: Major-General Richard Keightley
1987–1989: Major-General Simon Cooper
1989–1991: Major-General Peter Graham
1991–1994: Major-General Timothy Toyne Sewell
1994–1995: Major-General Hew Pike
1995–1997: Major-General Jack Deverell
1997-2000: Major-General Arthur Denaro
2001–2002: Major-General Philip Trousdell
2002–2006: Major-General Andrew Ritchie
2006–2007: Major-General Peter Pearson
2007–2009: Major-General David Rutherford-Jones
2009–2012: Major-General Patrick Marriott
2012–2013: Major-General Timothy Evans
2013–2015 Major-General Stuart Skeates
2015–2020 Major-General Paul Nanson
2020–2022 Major-General Duncan Capps
2022–present Major-General Zachary Stenning

References

See also
Royal Military College, Sandhurst

 
Senior appointments of the British Army
Royal Military College, Sandhurst